The girls' épée competition at the 2018 Summer Youth Olympics was held at the Africa Pavilion on 8 October.

Results

Pool Round

Pool 1

Pool 2

Bracket

Final standings

References

External links
Pool round results 
Ranking after pools 
Bracket 

Fencing at the 2018 Summer Youth Olympics